Bryan King (born 27 July 1935) is a former  Australian rules footballer who played with St Kilda in the Victorian Football League (VFL).

See also
 Australian football at the 1956 Summer Olympics

Notes

External links 

Living people
1935 births
Australian rules footballers from Victoria (Australia)
St Kilda Football Club players
Camperdown Football Club players